Michael Wayne Strahler (March 14, 1947 – July 14, 2016) was an American baseball player who played as a pitcher in the Major League Baseball. He pitched from 1970 to 1973 for the Los Angeles Dodgers and Detroit Tigers. He was traded from the Tigers to the Milwaukee Brewers for Ray Newman at the Winter Meetings on December 6, 1973.

Strahler died on July 14, 2016, aged 69.

References

External links
, or Retrosheet

1947 births
2016 deaths
Albuquerque Dukes players
Arizona Instructional League Dodgers players
Baseball players from Chicago
Cangrejeros de Santurce (baseball) players
Detroit Tigers players
Eugene Emeralds players
Liga de Béisbol Profesional Roberto Clemente pitchers
Los Angeles Dodgers players
Major League Baseball pitchers
Oklahoma City 89ers players
Sacramento City College alumni
Sacramento City Panthers baseball players
Salt Lake City Angels players
Spartanburg Phillies players
Spokane Indians players
Toledo Mud Hens players
Tucson Toros players